The 2013 Diamond Head Classic was a mid-season eight-team college basketball tournament played on December 22, 23, and 25 at the Stan Sheriff Center in Honolulu, Hawaii. It was the fifth annual Diamond Head Classic tournament and was part of the 2013–14 NCAA Division I men's basketball season. No. 14-ranked Iowa State defeated Boise State 70–66 to win the tournament championship. DeAndre Kane was named the tournament's MVP.

Bracket
* – Denotes overtime period

Source'''

All tournament team

Source

References

Diamond Head Classic
Diamond Head Classic
Diamond Head Classic